On October 26, 2021, Ralph Shaw shot and killed two people in the town of Faro, in Canada's Yukon Territory.

The Royal Canadian Mounted Police were first alerted to the Faro in order to solve a case of Domestic violence but were then called after residents heard gunfire. On 4:57 PM, RCMP officials placed the entire town into lockdown, eventually rescinding the order after 5:29 PM, issuing a statement to locals that they would still maintain a heavy presence in Faro, . After numerous door-to-door visits the RCMP confirmed that two people, 73 year old town councilor Patrick McCracken and Shaw's 42-year old estranged wife, Saenduean Honchaiyaphum were killed. One man was critically injured.

Jack Bowers, who was meant to be sworn in as the town's new mayor that day, had his date of swearing-in postponed in response. Yukon Premier Sandy Silver condemned the murders that afternoon.

References

External links 
People in Faro, Yukon, gather to honour shooting victims | CBC News
2 dead, man in custody after shooting in Faro, Yukon: RCMP | CBC News
Deadly shootings revealed 'community of heroes,' says mayor of Faro, Yukon | CBC News

Faro, Yukon Shootings
Faro, Yukon Shootings
Faro, Yukon Shootings
Faro, Yukon Shootings
Faro, Yukon Shootings
Death in Yukon
Gun politics in Canada
Mass shootings in Canada
Royal Canadian Mounted Police
Spree shootings in Canada
Mass Casualty Commission
Mass Casualty Commission